Spango Valley is a steep sided valley to the south-west of Greenock, Scotland. A small stream known as the Spango Burn, runs along the valley floor. The originally meandering burn has been channelised and straightened for much of its length as it runs south west through the valley.

The IBM Years 
IBM opened a factory in the valley in 1954 to manufacture typewriters and other office equipment. The 1954 factory was built on the site of Kingston Farm, the final building to be constructed by IBM was a call centre, on the site of Spango Farm, which was demolished to make way for it. Remaining farms in the valley are Dunrod, Chrisswell, Flatterton and Leitchland.

By 2009, the IBM factory was partially demolished as parts of the PC manufacturing business were sold to other companies. Around this time, the site and remaining buildings were sold by IBM and rebranded as Valley Park, from whom IBM leased some of the buildings that they still occupied. Another occupant on the site at that time was the National Microelectronics Institute. IBM completely vacated the site in October 2016 and moved to the east end of Greenock.

By September 2020, all buildings on the former IBM campus had been demolished.

IBM Gallery

Inverkip Road 
In the early 1980s the A742 Inverkip Road through Spango Valley was substantially upgraded to dual carriageway standard to accommodate the increased traffic to and from the IBM complex and the nearby Inverkip Power Station which has also since been demolished. At that time, the road was renumbered to A78 and became a trunk road. The former A78 road (through Gourock) was renumbered to A770 at the same time.

Inverkip Road Gallery

Railway 
The Greenock and Wemyss Bay Railway Company opened a line from Port Glasgow, through Spango Valley to Wemyss Bay in 1865. Ravenscraig station was a single platform station, located at the extreme north end of the valley, which was in use from 1865 to 1944.

Now part of the electrified Inverclyde railway line between Glasgow Central and Wemyss Bay, the single track line passes along the east side of the valley (between Branchton and Inverkip stations). IBM railway station, which opened in May 1978 as IBM Halt to serve the IBM factory had its services suspended on 8 December 2018 following demolition of the IBM factory.

A branch line left the main line at Dunrod Farm at the extreme south end of the valley.

Railway Gallery

Schools in the valley 
Two schools were located adjacent to each other in the north end of the valley. They shared an access road off Inverkip Road, including a bridge over the Spango Burn.
 
Greenock High School opened their new building 1971. This replaced the former high school building on Dunlop Street.

The new Glenburn Special Needs School opened in the 1960s.

By 2014, both schools had been closed and demolished. Glenburn relocated to the 'super campus' in the east end of Port Glasgow and Greenock High School merged with Grovepark High School to form Inverclyde Academy.

The schools site was later prepared for the construction of a new £75 million 300 cell prison for women. This included the building of a new access road and bridge across the Spango Burn. However, plans were dropped by the Scottish Government before construction began. This was due to a change in government policy related to the imprisonment of women. The site remains fenced off and unused at the time of writing in January 2022.

Schools in the valley Gallery

Current state 
The remaining land is farmland, with some housing on the northern fringes.

Future development 
Proposals for a £100 million mixed-use development on the northern half of the former IBM site were submitted to Inverclyde Council by a local company in February 2020. The plans include houses, shops, leisure and community facilities.

References

External links

Spango Valley on The Gazetter for Scotland website
Spango Valley on the Scotland's Places website
Valleypark - official website

Valleys of Inverclyde